Malegaon Outer Assembly constituency is one of the 288 Vidhan Sabha (legislative assembly) constituencies of Maharashtra state in western India.

Before the delimitation of Vidhan Sabha constituencies in 2008, Dabhadi (74) was a constituency of the Maharashtra Legislative Assembly between 1977-2004.

The Malegaon Outer (115) constituency belongs to the Dhule parliamentary constituency

Members of Vidhan Sabha

Election Results

1967 Elections
 V. B. Hire (INC) : 31,382 votes
 S. N. Patil (SSP) : 11,904

1972 Elections
 Hiray Baliram Vaman (INC) : 28,805 votes
 Shivaji Namdeo Patil (SOP) : 17,868

2019 Elections
 Dadaji Dagadu Bhuse (SHS ) : 121,252 votes   
 Tushar Shewale (Congress) : 73,568

See also
 Malegaon Central Assembly constituency
 Malegaon (Lok Sabha constituency)
 List of constituencies of Maharashtra Vidhan Sabha
 Legislative Assembly of Maharashtra
 Dhule (Lok Sabha constituency)
 List of Constituencies of the Lok Sabha
 Malegaon
 Dabhadi

References

Assembly constituencies of Maharashtra
Malegaon